The Sha'ar HaShamayim Synagogue (lit. Gate of Heaven) is located in Cairo, Egypt. The synagogue was also known as Temple Ismailia and the Adly Street Synagogue.

Its long-time leader was Chief Rabbi Chaim Nahum. In 2008, the synagogue marked its 100th anniversary. The synagogue was built in a style evoking ancient Egyptian temples, and was once the largest building on the boulevard.

When the synagogue opened in 1899, there was a vibrant Jewish community in Cairo. The last time the synagogue was full was in the 1960s. Today the community numbers 6 members, most of them older women.

Although it is considered a Sephardic synagogue, many Ashkenazi Jews were members of the congregation and contributed to its construction and upkeep.

In February 2010, a booby-trapped suitcase was hurled at the synagogue from a nearby hotel. The suitcase caught fire, but no one was hurt and no damage was reported.

See also
History of the Jews in Egypt

References

Bibliography
Rivka Ulmer, “The Sha‘ar Ha-Shamayim Synagogue (Keniset Isma‘iliyah,) in Cairo, Egypt,” in Maven in Blue Jeans: A Festschrift in Honor of Zev Garber (Shofar Suppl.; West Lafayette, in: Purdue University Press, 2009), 431–40.

Ashkenazi Jewish culture in Egypt
Downtown Cairo
Orthodox Judaism in Egypt
Orthodox synagogues
Religious organizations established in 1899
Sephardi Jewish culture in Egypt
Sephardi synagogues
Synagogues in Cairo
Synagogues completed in 1899
21st-century attacks on synagogues and Jewish communal organizations
19th-century religious buildings and structures in Egypt